Pingos are intrapermafrost ice-cored hills.

Pingo may also refer to:

People 
 Thomas Pingo (1714–1776), English medallist and die engraver
 Pingo (footballer, born 1968), born Luís Roberto Magalhães, Brazilian football midfielder and manager
 Pingo (footballer, born 1973), born Valdecir Ribeiro da Silva,  Brazilian football defensive midfielder
 Pingo (footballer, born 1980), born Erison Carlos dos Santos Silva, Brazilian football midfielder
 Pingo (footballer, born 1991), born Tarcisio Lopes da Silva, Brazilian football striker

Places  
 Pingo Canadian Landmark, Canadian protected area
 El Pingo, Argentine village
 Pingo River, Chilean river
 Kadleroshilik Pingo, Alaskan pingo
 Great Eastern Pingo Trail, English footbath
 Pingo-d'Água, Brazilian municipality
 Nant Cledlyn Pingos, Welsh site of special interest

Other  
 Pingo Doce, Portuguese supermarket operators
 The Isle of Pingo Pongo, 1938 cartoon film
 Pingo, character in the TV series Pingu
 Gas hydrate pingo, submarine dome structure
 Kettle (landform), a post-glacial depression known as pingo ponds in Norfolk, United Kingdom.

See also
 Pinga (disambiguation)